Anna Winger (née LeVine; born 1970) is an American writer, producer, screenwriter, and photographer who lives in Berlin, Germany. She is creator of the television dramas Deutschland 83, Deutschland 86, Deutschland 89, and Unorthodox.

Early life and education

Winger grew up in Massachusetts. Her parents are anthropologists, and their work led their family to live in Kenya and Mexico as well. She is Jewish.

She graduated from Columbia University in 1993.

Career
Before she started writing, Winger worked as a professional photographer for more than a decade.

Winger's first novel, This Must Be the Place, was published in 2008 by Riverhead Books.

Her personal essays have appeared in The New York Times Magazine, Condé Nast Traveler, Frankfurter Allgemeine Zeitung, and Süddeutsche Zeitung. Winger's radio series for NPR Worldwide, Berlin Stories, ran from 2009 to 2013.

Her first project as a screenwriter was Deutschland 83, a television drama which she co-created with her husband Joerg Winger. The series aired on Sundance TV (USA) in June 2015 and on RTL (Germany) in November and December 2015. The 8-episode series, about a young East German spy on an undercover mission to West Germany in 1983, had its world premiere when the first two episodes were shown at the 2015 Berlin Film Festival. Winger wrote the series in English, but it was shot in German. It is the first German-language series to be shown on American television.

In 2016, she founded her own Berlin-based production company, Studio Airlift.

She also co-created and co-produced 2018 Amazon Prime and Sundance TV miniseries Deutschland 86, which is the follow-up season to Deutschland 83. The third installment, Deutschland 89, was broadcast in 2021.

Winger and Alexa Karolinski served as co-creators and co-writers of miniseries Unorthodox, which debuted on March 26, 2020 and is Netflix's first ever Yiddish show. She signed an overall deal with Netflix in 2021.

Personal life 
Winger met her husband in Chile. Before 2002, Winger lived in New York and her husband Joerg Winger lived in Cologne, Germany. In 2002, they moved to Berlin, Germany. They have two daughters.

She speaks English, Spanish and German, but always writes in English.

Filmography

References

External links
 
 Berlin Stories of NPR 
 Berlinale press announcement 
 Interview Interview about Berlin and writing between languages (blog)
 

Living people
1970 births
20th-century American non-fiction writers
20th-century American novelists
20th-century American women writers
21st-century American Jews
21st-century American women
American emigrants to Germany
American expatriates in Germany
American radio producers
American women non-fiction writers
American women novelists
Columbia College (New York) alumni
Jewish American writers
The New York Times writers
Novelists from New York (state)
Women radio producers